This article is a list of events in the year 2012 in Senegal.

Incumbents
 President: Abdoulaye Wade (until April 2), Macky Sall (from April 2)
 Prime Minister: Souleymane Ndéné Ndiaye (until April 5), Abdoul Mbaye (from April 5)

Events

March
 March 25 - Voters go to the polls to vote for the presidential election with President Wade conceding defeat to former Prime Minister Macky Sall.
 March 26 - Macky Sall is elected President of Senegal.

References

 
2010s in Senegal
Years of the 21st century in Senegal
Senegal
Senegal